Teia may refer to the following:

Teia, the last Ostrogothic king in Italy
Teià, a municipality in Maresme county, Catalonia, Spain
Teia (moth), a moth genus in the family Erebidae 
Teia anartoides, the painted apple moth
Teia Maru, a Japanese ship of World War II

See also
 Theia (disambiguation)